Synthespians™ is a BBC Books original novel written by Craig Hinton (the author's last) and based on the long-running British science fiction television series Doctor Who. It features the Sixth Doctor and Peri, as well the Autons.

Plot
The Doctor and Peri land on Reef Station One, an isolated space station that has modelled itself on 1980s popular culture and encounter Autons.

Continuity
According to this novel, the name of the Auton home planet is Polymos, and the Doctor's people, the Time Lords, attempted to destroy it. Dialogue in the first episode of the new series, "Rose", may hint at this occurrence.

Notes
The novel's original front cover had to be changed at the last minute due to copyright issues over the image used (a doctored publicity shot from Dynasty).

References

External links
The Cloister Library - Synthespians™

2004 British novels
2004 science fiction novels
Past Doctor Adventures
Sixth Doctor novels
Novels by Craig Hinton
BBC Books books